Lloyd Wesley Merritt (born April 8, 1933) is a former professional baseball player.  He was a right-handed pitcher for one season (1957) with the St. Louis Cardinals.  For his career, he compiled a 1–2 record, with a 3.31 earned run average, and 35 strikeouts in 65⅓ innings pitched.

An alumnus of Washington University in St. Louis, he was born in St. Louis, Missouri.

External links

1933 births
Living people
Atlanta Braves scouts
Baseball players from Missouri
Birmingham Barons players
Houston Buffaloes players
Houston Buffs players
Joplin Miners players
Kansas City Blues (baseball) players
Little Rock Travelers players
Major League Baseball pitchers
Minor league baseball managers
Omaha Cardinals players
Philadelphia Phillies scouts
Norfolk Tars players
Quincy Gems players
Rochester Red Wings players
St. Louis Cardinals players
Spokane Indians players
Vancouver Mounties players
Washington University Bears baseball players
American expatriate baseball players in Colombia
American expatriate baseball players in Canada
American expatriate baseball players in Cuba
Gastonia Cardinals players